"Cry" is a song by English alternative rock band the Sundays. Written and produced by guitarist David Gavurin and lead singer Harriet Wheeler, the song was recorded for the band's third and final studio album, Static & Silence (1997), and released on 10 November 1997 as the second single from the album. The song reached number 43 on the UK Singles Chart.

Track listings
UK CD1
 "Cry"
 "Can't Be Sure" (demo)
 "You're Not the Only One I Know" (demo)

UK CD2
 "Cry"
 "Through the Dark"
 "Life Goes On"

UK cassette single
 "Cry"
 "Through the Dark"

Personnel
 Harriet Wheeler – vocals, engineering, mixing
 David Gavurin – guitar, engineering, mixing
 Paul Brindley – bass guitar
 Patrick Hannan – drums
 Dave Anderson – engineering, mixing
Source:

Charts

Release history

References

The Sundays songs
1997 singles
1997 songs
DGC Records singles
Parlophone singles
Songs written by Harriet Wheeler